Yordan Bozdanski (born 7 October 1964) is a Bulgarian former football player and former football manager of Pirin Blagoevgrad.

Career
Born in Sandanski, Yordan Bozdanski played in his career for Pirin Blagoevgrad, Vihren Sandanski, Pirin Gotse Delchev, Septemvri Simitli, Greek Ethnikos Piraeus, Spanish UD Las Palmas and Macedonian FK Maleš. He began managing prior to his retirement as a player.

Honours

As a player 
 Pirin Blagoevgrad
 Bulgarian Cup
 Runner-up (1): 1993-94

As a coach 
 Vihren Sandanski
 B PFG
 Winner (1): 2004-05

References

Living people
1964 births
Bulgarian footballers
Bulgarian expatriate footballers
Bulgarian football managers
OFC Pirin Blagoevgrad players
OFC Vihren Sandanski players
Ethnikos Piraeus F.C. players
UD Las Palmas players
PFC Pirin Gotse Delchev players
First Professional Football League (Bulgaria) players
Expatriate footballers in Greece
Expatriate footballers in Spain
Expatriate footballers in North Macedonia
Macedonian Bulgarians
People from Sandanski
Association football forwards
OFC Vihren Sandanski managers
PFC Pirin Blagoevgrad managers
Sportspeople from Blagoevgrad Province